Dust off may refer to:
Dustoff or casualty evacuation, the emergency evacuation of casualties from a combat zone
Dust-Off, cleaning utensil